Mayville is an unincorporated community in Mower County, Minnesota, United States.

Notes

Unincorporated communities in Mower County, Minnesota
Unincorporated communities in Minnesota